Starbase Hyperion is a 1980 video game written by Don Ursem for the Exidy Sorcerer and published by Quality Software in 1980. An Atari 8-bit family port followed in 1981.

Contents
Starbase Hyperion is a strategic space game which requires the player, as the starbase commander, to defend the base against invasion forces of an alien empire.

Reception
Tom M. Buchanan reviewed Starbase Hyperion in The Space Gamer No. 34. Buchanan commented that "This is an excellent computer simulation game. The full graphics and real-time combat displays make the game visually challenging. If you're looking for a game with challenging play instead of complex rules and you own a Sorcerer computer, this game is a must."

References

External links
Review in Creative Computing

1980 video games
Atari 8-bit family games
Strategy video games
Video games developed in the United States